For the serial killer, see Milton Johnson.

R. Milton Johnson (born 1957/58) is an American businessman and philanthropist from Tennessee. He served as the chairman and chief executive officer of Hospital Corporation of America. With his wife, he has supported his alma mater, Belmont University, where a building is named in their honor.

Early life
R. Milton Johnson was born in Nashville, Tennessee. He was raised by a single mother.

Johnson graduated from Stratford High School in 1974. He attended Nashville State Community College and won a scholarship to transfer to Belmont University, where he graduated with a bachelor's degree in accounting.

Career
Johnson worked for Ernst & Young.

Johnson joined the Hospital Corporation of America in 1982. He was appointed as executive vice president in 2004. He has served as its chairman and chief executive officer since 2014, and succeeded Richard Bracken, who retired at the end of 2013. Johnson retired from HCA in January 2019 and was succeeded by Sam Hazen.

Johnson is the chair of the board of directors of the Nashville Area Chamber of Commerce as of 2017-2018, and he serves on the board of the Nashville Health Care Council.

Civic and political activities
Johnson serves on the board of the United Way of Metropolitan Nashville. He was inducted into the Nashville Public Schools Hall of Fame in 2010. In 2011, he co-chaired a benefit for the Minnie Pearl Cancer Foundation.

Johnson serves on the board of trustees of his alma mater, Belmont University, for 2017-2018. With his wife, he donated $10 million to the university for a scholarship program in 2015. The same year, the university named the R. Milton and Denice Johnson Center in their honor.

In 2015, Johnson donated US$1,500 in political contributions to Megan Barry's successful campaign to become Mayor of Nashville.

Personal life
Johnson is married to Denice Johnson. They have two children.

References

1950s births
Living people
HCA Healthcare people
People from Nashville, Tennessee
Belmont University alumni
Businesspeople from Tennessee
American chief executives
Philanthropists from Tennessee